Cross Mountain is a mountain located in the Catskill Mountains of New York southwest of Margaretville. Touchmenot Mountain is located southwest of Cross Mountain and Barkaboom Mountain is located southwest.

References

Mountains of Delaware County, New York
Mountains of New York (state)